The FreeRolls is a Lebanese rock music band formed in Beirut in 2011. The group consists of Elie Zeidan (guitar,vocals), Samuel George (keyboard), Roy George (guitar), Tony Hawa (drums) and Martin Nassif (bass). the members of the FreeRolls work on a self-financed home studio where they produce their own tracks by themselves. Playing southern rock, post grunge and hard rock, and influenced by many bands such as The Allman Brothers, Matchbox 20, Led Zeppelin and Dave Matthews Band, the group has released an EP, and album, and three singles since 2011.

Early life 
The band was founded by Elie Zeidan (guitar, vocals) and Samuel George (keyboard) back in 2005, during high school years where they have called the band "Rebellious Phoenix", when they decided to play some sophisticated tunes inspired by the 70's southern rock and hard rock era, along with 80's rock music and 90's post grunge. Roy (guitar), Sam's brother,  joined the band just as they were composing their first original. After playing at high school events and concerts, the band moved on to perform in different events across Lebanon. In 2011 the band recorded demos of their originals (home studio) under the name of "The FreeRolls" just as Martin Nassif (bass) joined the band. The demo projects made the band shift their focus towards recording, changing their cover band image into a more independent one.

Career 
Influenced by The Allman Brothers, Led Zeppelin, Matchbox 20 and Dave Matthews Band, The FreeRolls started working on a self-financed home studio to be able to produce their own tracks by themselves, with a little help from friends and fans. In September 2013 the band began the recording process of their debut EP “After Taste”, in Elie's bedroom, and in December 2013 they released their first single “Wear Something Nice”.
Their debut EP “After Taste” was released in May 2014, and the band was pretty satisfied with the feedback, which pushed it to extend their EP by producing a full album.  
"Ya Mazen” was their second single released in August 2014. The song started as a joke, inspired by a humorous story they had previously experienced, which led them into an unusual and new (temporary) musical path which is the oriental/Lebanese fusion. Since the song was recorded for fun, the band hesitated about  making an official release, but the whole process was so natural and spontaneous that they decided to release the track. In May 2015, the band released its third single "Act Like Night". 
On October 7, 2015, at The Backdoor, a club in Gemmayzeh, Beirut, Lebanon, the band released its first album "Lust and Fond" which included the singles "Wear Something Nice", "Ya Mazen" and "Act Like Night", along with eight other songs.
The band has been performing all over Lebanon since 2011, where they have performed in many Lebanese bars in Beirut, fundraising concerts  and other Lebanese events.

Discography

Singles
 "Wear Something Nice" (2014)
 "Ya Mazen" (2014)
 "Act Like Night" (2015)

EPs 
 After Taste (2014)

Albums
 Lust and Fond(2015)

References

External links
The FreeRolls on YouTube

Musical groups established in 2011
Lebanese rock music groups
2011 establishments in Lebanon